Youth Milan FC is a Barbados football club, based in Checker Hall in the northern parish of Saint Lucy.

Sponsored by Arawak Cement, they play in the Barbados' first division, the Barbados Premier Division.

Achievements
Barbados Premier Division: 2
 2006, 2011

Barbados FA Cup: 2
 2002, 2009

References

Football clubs in Barbados